Jóhanna Björk Sveinsdóttir (born 20 October 1989) is an Icelandic former basketball player and a former member of the Icelandic national basketball team.

Playing career
After starting her career with Hamar, Jóhanna won the Icelandic championship in 2010 as a member of KR and the Icelandic Basketball Cup in 2014 with Haukar. After playing for Skallagrímur from 2016 to 2018, where she reached the Cup semi-finals in 2018, she signed with Stjarnan in June 2018.

After a one-year hiatus, Jóhanna signed with Úrvalsdeild club Valur on 7 August 2020.

In August 2021, Jóhanna signed with 1. deild kvenna club Stjarnan.

Icelandic national team
Jóhanna was first selected to the Icelandic national basketball team in 2008. From then to 2018, she played 12 games for the national team.

Awards and honours

Titles
 Icelandic champion (2010)
 Icelandic Basketball Cup (2014)
 Icelandic Supercup (2009)
 Icelandic Company Cup (2009)
 Icelandic Division I (2006)

Honours
 Icelandic All-Star game: 2009

References

External links
Icelandic statistics 2008-present

1989 births
Living people
Johanna Bjork Sveinsdottir
Johanna Bjork Sveinsdottir
Johanna Bjork Sveinsdottir
Johanna Bjork Sveinsdottir
Johanna Bjork Sveinsdottir
Johanna Bjork Sveinsdottir
Johanna Bjork Sveinsdottir
Johanna Bjork Sveinsdottir
Forwards (basketball)
Johanna Bjork Sveinsdottir